A monkey tail is the tail visible on some monkeys.

Monkey tail may also refer to:

 At sign, the symbol "@" also known as a monkey tail or apetail
 Monkey tail plant, the plant Heliotropium curassavicum
 Monkey tail tree, the tree Araucaria araucana
 Monkey's tail, a Chilean drink, Cola de mono
 Monkey's tail, a stopper knot for ropes

See also 

 Monkey fist, a type of knot